The X7 Coastrider is an hourly bus route between Perth and Aberdeen via Dundee operated by Stagecoach East Scotland. The service runs seven days per week.

History 
The route was introduced on 12 September 2011 and was initially operated by a fleet of six new Plaxton Elite coaches. In 2014, Stagecoach purchased eight new Plaxton Elite-i interdeck coaches for the route. These began service on 24 November. At this time, the southern terminus of the service was also extended from Dundee to Perth. The extension replaced route number 333, which operated between Perth Royal Infirmary and Ninewells Hospital. A ninth coach was subsequently acquired for the route. In 2020, additional services numbered X7 were introduced between Aberdeen and Stonehaven, some of which continue through Stonehaven, providing an additional town service.

Criticism 
The introduction of new coaches has been criticised by passengers who claim that they have insufficient space for wheelchair users, and that the steep stairs are hard to climb. The service is used by patients at Perth Royal Infirmary and Ninewells Hospital in Dundee. In response, Stagecoach stated that the vehicles meet Disability Discrimination Act standards and all had a space for a wheelchair user. The company stated in 2018 that the coaches were necessary to meet demand for the X7 service and that low-floor vehicles would have insufficient capacity.

Despite this, in September 2017, the company introduced a service numbered X8 to increase the frequency of service between Perth and Arbroath and "providing an alternative option for customers who may struggle with the stairs on the X7". The X8 route was withdrawn in 2018.

References 

Bus routes in Scotland
Stagecoach Group